Boy Pablo (stylized as boy pablo) is the indie pop music project of Chilean–Norwegian singer songwriter Nicolas Muñoz. In the recording studio,  Muñoz writes, records, performs, and produces all of the project's music. As a touring act, Boy Pablo currently consists of Nicolás Muñoz (guitar, vocals), Gabriel Muñoz (lead guitar), Judah Kubendran (bass guitar) and Esteban Muñoz (drums).

Boy Pablo gained attention in late 2017 after the music video for the song "Everytime" gained international popularity on YouTube's algorithm. The duology concept EPs Roy Pablo (2017) and Soy Pablo (2018) were released under Boy Pablo's own independent label 777 MUSIC. Their debut studio album, Wachito Rico was released in October 2020. Out of nominations for six Norwegian Grammy Awards, Boy Pablo has won two, and has additionally been nominated for three GAFFA Awards and one P3 Gull award, having won the latter.

Early life 
Nicolás Pablo Rivera Muñoz (born 29 November 1998) grew up in Bergen after his Chilean parents immigrated to Norway in the 1980s. Born into a musical family as the youngest child, his father and brother were both multi-instrumentalists and helped teach him how to play guitar, drums, bass guitar and piano. He attended secondary school at Kongshaug Upper Secondary School of Music, a music boarding school in nearby Os. He and his parents moved to Os, Hordaland when he started secondary school, two years prior to January 2017.

History

2015–2016: Career beginnings 
Muñoz began the "Boy Pablo" project in December 2015, and released its debut single "Flowers" in January 2016. Boy Pablo played its first-ever gig as a warm-up band for Tellef Raabe (brother of Norwegian singer Sigrid) at Hulen in April 2016. In September 2016, they performed as part of the Vill Vill Vest festival in Bergen. Boy Pablo as a group gained immense national popularity after receiving a Bergenfest scholarship of 35 thousand kroner in November 2016. Alongside this scholarship, the group additionally won their own headlining gig as well as a performance at the 2017 Bergenfest.

2017–2019: Roy Pablo and Soy Pablo 
Muñoz further gained international popularity in 2017 with the song and music video for "Everytime", originally uploaded to YouTube in May 2017. Within a few weeks, the video had received millions of views, with Muñoz significantly expanding his fanbase. Boy Pablo released the 6-song EP, Roy Pablo, in May 2017, which includes "Everytime". In August 2017, Boy Pablo opened as a supporting act for American band Beach Fossils at Red Bull Sound Select in Oslo.

Boy Pablo released the single "Losing You" in March 2018, and embarked on a sold out thirty-nine date headlining world tour of United States, Europe and Asia. On 5 October 2018 Boy Pablo released its second EP, Soy Pablo. The EP received critical acclaim and was successful commercially in Norway, topping the national Vinyl albums chart. The EP additionally landed in the top 10 of year-end critics lists from Gaffa and Nöjesguiden, placing at Nos. 9 and 4 respectively. At the 2018 Spellemannprisen (also referred to as Norwegian Grammy Awards), Boy Pablo was awarded with the award for Breakthrough of the Year which additionally gave them the Gramo scholarship of 250 thousand kroner. At the same ceremony they were nominated in the categories of Best International Success, and Indie/Alternative of the Year for Soy Pablo. At the 2018 P3 Gull Awards, Boy Pablo also won Årets Nykommer. In January 2019, Boy Pablo was the only Norwegian act to perform at the Coachella Valley Music and Arts Festival in California, U.S. in that year. At the 2019 Spellemannprisen (also referred to as Norwegian Grammy Awards), Boy Pablo was nominated for Best International Success for the second consecutive year in addition to Årets Musikkvideo ("Losing You").

2020: Wachito Rico
In May 2020, Boy Pablo announced the release of its debut studio album, Wachito Rico; the title is a Chilean expression and means "handsome boy." The album's singles are "Hey Girl", "Honey" and "Rest Up". With the release of the latter single, Boy Pablo announced its second-ever headlining world tour to support Wachito Rico, which kicked off in the UK in March 2021.

Live personnel 
Nicolas Pablo Rivera Muñoz – rhythm guitar, vocals
Gabriel Muñoz – lead guitar
Esteban Muñoz - drums
Judah Kubendran - bass

former members:
Eric Tryland – keyboard, backing vocals
Henrik Åmdal – bass guitar
Sigmund Vestrheim – drums

Artistry 
Muñoz cites Mac DeMarco, Veronica Maggio, Tyler, The Creator, The Beatles, Arctic Monkeys, Tame Impala and Mild High Club as musical influences. His rise to fame with a DIY-produced bedroom pop track,"Everytime" (2017), which gained popularity through the YouTube algorithm has drawn comparisons to that of American singer Clairo's rise to fame with her video for "Pretty Girl" (2017).

Discography

Studio albums

Extended plays

Singles

Awards and nominations

Notes

References

External links
 

Norwegian indie pop groups
Norwegian people of Chilean descent
Musicians from Bergen
Bedroom pop musicians
Musicians from Os, Hordaland